WJNR-FM (101.5 FM) is a radio station broadcasting a country music format. Licensed to Iron Mountain, Michigan; it began broadcasting in 1972.

Sources 
Michiguide.com - WJNR-FM history

External links

JNR-FM
Country radio stations in the United States
Radio stations established in 1972